Vladimir Smirnov may refer to:
Vladimir Smirnov (politician) (1887–1937), Russian Bolshevik and Soviet politician
Vladimir Smirnov (mathematician) (1887–1974), Soviet mathematician
Vladimir Smirnov (fencer) (1954–1982), Soviet fencer killed at the 1982 World Championships
Vladimir Smirnov (businessman) (born 1957), Russian businessman
Vladimir Smirnov (skier) (born 1964), Soviet/Kazakhstani cross-country skier
Vladimir Smirnov (ski jumper) (born 1947), Soviet Olympic ski jumper
Vladimir A. Smirnoff (1917–2000), Soviet-born Canadian entomologist
Vladimir Nikolaevich Smirnov (1947–2014), Soviet footballer
Vladimir Smirnov (footballer) (born 1977), Russian footballer
Vladimir Smirnov (cyclist) (born 1978), former Lithuanian cyclist
Vladimir Vasilyevich Smirnov (1849–1918), Imperial Russian Army general
Vladimir Smirnov (philosopher) (1932–1996), Russian philosopher
 (1876–1952), Russian Bolshevik and Soviet consul to Stockholm
Vladimir Smirnov (general) (1899-1985), Yugoslav partisan and general
Vladimir Smirnov (speedway rider), Soviet Union speedway rider

See also
 Smirnov (surname)
 Smirnoff (surname)